The Filmfare Best Choreography Award is given by the Filmfare magazine as part of its annual Filmfare Awards for Hindi films.

Although the awards started in 1954, the best choreography category did not start until 1989.

Saroj Khan with 8 wins holds the record of most awards in this category, followed by Farah Khan with 7 wins. Saroj Khan holds the record of being the first recipient of this award in 1989, when the Filmfare Best Choreography Award was started.

Saroj Khan also holds the record of winning the award consecutively for 3 years making a hat trick at the Filmfare Awards in 1989,1990,1991.

Awards
Here is a list of the award winners and the films for which they won.

See also
 Filmfare Awards
 Bollywood
 Cinema of India

References 

Choreography
Indian choreography awards